Michael Burton Wood (born April 26, 1980) is an American former professional baseball pitcher. He played all or parts of five seasons in Major League Baseball (MLB), and one in Nippon Professional Baseball (NPB), from 2003-08.

Career
Wood graduated from Forest Hill Community School in West Palm Beach, Florida, in 1997 and then went on to attend the University of North Florida. He was drafted by the Oakland Athletics in the tenth round (311th overall) of the 2001 Major League Baseball Draft.

Wood made his major league debut on August 21, 2003, with the Athletics. The Kansas City Royals acquired Wood on June 24, 2004, from the Athletics as part of the three-team trade that sent Carlos Beltrán to the Houston Astros. Kansas City immediately promoted him from Triple-A and put him in their starting rotation, where he compiled a 3–8 record with a 5.94 ERA in 17 starts.

Wood spent the early part of the 2005 season in the bullpen, but was used as an emergency starter when Brian Anderson went on the 15-day disabled list.

On October 11, 2006, Wood was claimed off waivers by the Texas Rangers, but was not tendered a contract for the 2007 season, making him a free agent. He was then signed to a minor league contract (with an invitation to spring training) with the Rangers later in the off-season, and made the 2007 opening day roster.

In 2008, Wood played for the Yokohama BayStars of the NPB. In January 2009, he signed a minor league contract with the Florida Marlins. In May 2009, the Marlins released Wood. On September 1, Wood signed a minor league contract with the Texas Rangers. He was granted free agency on November 9. He played for the Rockford RiverHawks in the Northern League in 2019.

References

External links

1980 births
Living people
American expatriate baseball players in Canada
American expatriate baseball players in Japan
Baseball players from Florida
Forest Hill Community High School alumni
Kansas City Royals players
Major League Baseball pitchers
Midland RockHounds players
Modesto A's players
New Orleans Zephyrs players
Nippon Professional Baseball pitchers
North Florida Ospreys baseball players
Oakland Athletics players
Oklahoma City RedHawks players
Oklahoma RedHawks players
Omaha Royals players
Rockford RiverHawks players
Sacramento River Cats players
Sportspeople from West Palm Beach, Florida
Texas Rangers players
Vancouver Canadians players
Wichita Wranglers players
Yokohama BayStars players